Gronlund is a surname. Notable people with this name include:

Laurence Gronlund (1846–1899), Danish-born American lawyer, writer, lecturer, and political activist
Linda Gronlund, victim of the 9/11 terrorist attacks
Lisbeth Gronlund (born 1959), American physicist and nuclear disarmament expert

See also
Grønlund, a Scandinavian surname
Grönlund, a Finnish surname
Grønland (disambiguation)